Bamboo clappers are a traditional Chinese percussion instrument and a traditional Burmese instrument.  Reflecting its name, it is made with boards of bamboo. Bamboo clappers are used in Chinese kuaiban storytelling performances.

See also 
 Chinese music
 List of Chinese musical instruments
 Traditional Japanese musical instruments

References 

Chinese musical instruments
Asian percussion instruments